François Rom (8 April 1882 – 2 February 1942) was a Belgian fencer. He won a bronze medal in the team épée event at the 1908 Summer Olympics.

Olympic events
 1908 Summer Olympics in London
 Fencing – Épée, individual
 Fencing – Épée, team – Bronze medal
 1912 Summer Olympics in Stockholm
 Fencing – Épée, team – Gold medal

References

External links
 

1882 births
1942 deaths
Sportspeople from Antwerp
Belgian male fencers
Belgian épée fencers
Olympic fencers of Belgium
Olympic gold medalists for Belgium
Olympic bronze medalists for Belgium
Olympic medalists in fencing
Medalists at the 1908 Summer Olympics
Medalists at the 1912 Summer Olympics
Fencers at the 1908 Summer Olympics
Fencers at the 1912 Summer Olympics